Samaritan Girl is a 2004 South Korean film written and directed by Kim Ki-duk.

Synopsis
Yeo-jin and Jae-yeong are two teenage girls who are trying to earn money for a trip to Europe. To reach this end, Jae-yeong is prostituting herself while Yeo-jin acts as her pimp, setting her up with the clients and staying on guard for the police. Things take a turn for the worse when Yeo-jin gets distracted from her duty and the police raid the motel where Jae-yeong is meeting with a client. To avoid getting caught, Jae-yeong jumps out of a window, fatally injuring herself.

After Jae-yeong's death, Yeo-jin blames herself and to ease her own conscience, sets to return all of the money they earned to the clients while sleeping with them herself. Eventually Yeo-jin's father, a policeman, is devastated when he discovers what she is doing. He starts following her discreetly and confronts her clients with increasingly violent results. Finally, he ends up brutally killing a client.

For the rest of its duration, the movie follows the father and daughter on a short trip to the countryside, where they both sense something is wrong with the other, but are unable to confront each other directly. In the end, the law catches up with the father, who hopes to have done enough to prepare Yeo-jin for her life without him.

Cast
Kwak Ji-min - Yeo-jin
Han Yeo-reum (credited as Seo Min-jeong) - Jae-yeong 
Lee Eol - Yeong-ki, Yeo-jin's father

Reception
As with other films by Kim Ki-duk, Samaritan Girl was not a box office success in its home country, but was better received overseas. After it won the Silver Bear, the second place award at the 2004 Berlin International Film Festival, it became a sought-after film for other international film festivals.

References

External links and references

2004 films
2004 drama films
Films directed by Kim Ki-duk
South Korean independent films
2000s Korean-language films
South Korean drama films
Films about prostitution in South Korea
2000s South Korean films
South Korean LGBT-related films